Clinic Exclusive (UK theatrical title: Clinic Xclusive; working title With These Hands; re-released as Sex Clinic) is a 1971 British erotic film directed by Don Chaffey and starring Georgina Ward, Alexander Davion, Carmen Silvera and Windsor Davies.

Plot
Julie Mason (Georgina Ward) abuses her position as the owner of a private health clinic by selling sexual favours to her male clients, whom she then blackmails for large amounts of money. At the same time, she resists the sexual advances of Elsa Farson (Carmen Silvera), a lonely, older woman.

When businessman Lee Maitland (Alexander Davion) engages her services, Julie, who wants to make a new life for herself, is taken by her new client and quickly becomes his fiancée. Meanwhile, barred from visiting Julie, Farson is driven to suicide.

Julie is drawn into Maitland's plan to make them both rich, unaware that he is actually Farson's son and intends to avenge his mother. The film ends with Maitland, having faked his death in a road accident that Julie helped to create, disappearing with tens of thousands of pounds that Julie had extracted from her clients. Julie is left to choose between admitting blackmail or remaining silent and being charged with Maitland's murder.

Cast
 Georgina Ward as Julie Mason
 Alexander Davion as Lee Maitland
 Polly Adams as Ann
 Mike Lewin as Roger Dawes 
 Carmen Silvera as Elsa Farson 
 Vincent Ball as Bernard Wilcox
 Basil Moss as Philip Eveleigh 
 Tony Wright as Police Inspector
 Geoffrey Morris as Sir Roderick Clyde
 Maria Coyne as Marilyn
 April Olrich as Paula
 Windsor Davies as Geoffrey Carter
 Peter Halliday as Mr Fawcett

Production
The film was written and produced by Hazel Adair and Kent Walton under the joint pseudonym "Elton Hawke". Many of the cast had appeared in either Crossroads or Compact, soap operas co-created by Adair.

Clinic Exclusive marks the film debut of Carmen Silvera, later known for her role as Edith Artois in the BBC TV sitcom 'Allo 'Allo!.

Release
Originally titled Clinic Xclusive, the film was re-released in May 1975 as Sex Clinic.

Critical response
Writing for The Monthly Film Bulletin in 1972, critic Nigel Andrews described the film as "quite a neat, unpredictable revenge thriller", praising its "glossily efficient" script and direction as well as the performance of Ward. He concluded that Clinic Exclusive is "altogether a surprisingly competent production, if only within the limits of its strictly catchpenny genre". The publication in the press of stills from the film led to Georgina Ward withdrawing an application to be a UK parliamentary candidate for the Labour Party.

References

External links

1970s erotic films
1971 LGBT-related films
1971 films
British erotic films
British LGBT-related films
1970s English-language films
Films about criminals
Films directed by Don Chaffey
Lesbian-related films
British films about revenge
1970s British films